Ivan the Terrible, Op. 116, is the score composed by Sergei Prokofiev for Sergei Eisenstein's film Ivan the Terrible (1942–45) and its sequel (1946), the first two parts of an incomplete trilogy. The project was Prokofiev's second collaboration with Eisenstein, the first being the popular Aleksandr Nevskiy (1938). The majority of the non-liturgical song texts were written by Vladimir Lugovskoy, who collaborated with Prokofiev on the texts for Aleksandr Nevskiy.

The subject of the "First Tale" (Part 1) is the early years, 1547 to 1565, of the reign of Ivan IV of Russia: his coronation, his intent to curb the powers of the boyars, his wedding, his conquest of Kazan, his almost fatal illness, the poisoning and death of his first wife Anastasiya, the formation of the Oprichniki, and his abdication.

The "Second Tale" (Part 2), subtitled The Boyar Conspiracy, covers the years 1565 to 1569, and concerns the defection of Prince Kurbskiy to Poland-Lithuania, Ivan's disputes with Philip II, Metropolitan of Moscow, the intrigues of the boyars, the excesses of the Oprichniki, the attempted coup by the boyars and Ivan's aunt, Yefrosinya Staritskaya, the murder of her son Vladimir Staritsky, and Ivan's triumph over his domestic enemies.

The film scores were not published during Prokofiev's lifetime. They were arranged in 1961 as an oratorio for soloists, chorus, and orchestra by Levon Atovmyan, one of Prokofiev's assistants. However, before this version could be performed, the music received its concert premiere in 1961 in Moscow in the form of an oratorio for speaker, soloists, chorus, and orchestra by Abram Stasevich, who had conducted the film soundtracks for Eisenstein.

In 1973 the composer Mikhail Chulaki and choreographer Yuri Grigorovich drew on Prokofiev's film scores to create the ballet Ivan the Terrible, which was given its premiere in 1975. Later performing editions of the scores include an oratorio put together by Michael Lankester (1989), and a concert scenario by Christopher Palmer (1991). The restoration of the entire original film score has been published and recorded.

History

Composition history

Performance history
The film Ivan the Terrible (Part One) premiered on 30 December 1944. The sequel, The Boyar Conspiracy (Part Two), was not shown until 1958.

The concert premiere of the soundtrack film score, as restored by Frank Strobel, took place on 16 September 2016 at the Musikfest Berlin, accompanied by a showing of the film in the Great Hall of the Konzerthaus Berlin. Strobel conducted the Rundfunk-Sinfonieorchester Berlin and the Rundfunkchor Berlin, with soloists Marina Prudenskaya (contralto) and Alexander Vinogradov (bass).

Publication history
1958, 'Songs and Choruses from the Music for the Film Ivan the Terrible, vocal scores, published by Levon Atovmyan in the magazine Sovetskaya Muzyka; the six numbers included:
'The Black Cloud'
'Ocean-Sea'
'Song of Praise'
'The Swan'
'The Cannoneers'
'Song about the Beaver'
1960, 'Songs and Choruses from Cantatas, Oratorios, and Films', published by Levon Atovmyan, vocal scores, Sovetskiy Kompozitor; the numbers from Ivan the Terrible included:
'The Oath of the Oprichniki'
'Song of Fyodor Basmanov and the Oprichniki'
'Song of the Oprichniki'
1997, Ivan the Terrible, manuscript film score, full score, edition by Marina Rakhmanova and Irina Medvedeva, Musikverlage Hans Sikorski, Hamburg
2016, Ivan the Terrible, soundtrack film score, full score, edition by Frank Strobel, Musikverlage Hans Sikorski, Hamburg

Scoring and instrumentation
The two film scores together require a contralto or mezzo-soprano (in 'Ocean-Sea' and 'Song about the Beaver'), a baritone or bass (in 'Song of the Oprichniki'), a bass (in 'Many Years!'), mixed (SATB) chorus, and the following instrumentation:

Strings: violins I & II, violas, cellos, double basses
Woodwinds: piccolo, 2 flutes, 2 oboes, english horn, 3 clarinets, E-flat clarinet, bass clarinet, alto saxophone, tenor saxophone, 4 bassoons, contrabassoon
Brass: 5 horns, 5 trumpets, 3 trombones, 2 tubas
Percussion: timpani, bass drum, snare drum, triangle, tambourine, cymbals, tam-tam, bells, church bells, glockenspiel, xylophone, wood block, whip
Other: piano, harp

Manuscript numbers
The numbers in Prokofiev's manuscript scores are listed in the table below. The table can be sorted by clicking on the buttons in the title bar. The default sequence can be restored by refreshing the browser (press F5).

Note: The column marked 'S' shows the numbering of the musical numbers by Musikverlage Hans Sikorski, the publisher of the restored manuscript film score (zeros have been inserted before single digit numbers for sorting purposes). 'A' stands for Anhang (the appendix), which includes the liturgical numbers used in the film that were either arranged by Prokofiev or were not written into his score of Ivan the Terrible.

The performance duration is about 100 minutes.

Several numbers can be divided into two parts, which are sometimes quoted in the film separately:

 The first half of the 'Overture' is the orchestral 'A Storm Approaches' (the Ivan theme), which is used very liberally in both films as a leitmotiv; the second half is the chorus 'The Black Cloud', which is used only at the beginning of each film as part of the overture.
 The first part of 'The Death of Glinskaya' accompanies, in the second film, the flashback of the poisoning of the 8-year-old-Ivan's mother; the second part is the chorus 'On the Bones of our Enemies' (the sung portion of which was used in neither film).
 The first half of 'Come Back!' depicts the people's chorus of supplication after Ivan's abdication; the second half is the 'Finale' (a variation of 'A Storm Approaches'), which concludes both films.

Film score cues
Ivan the Terrible (Part 1, 1944)

Ivan the Terrible: The Boyar Conspiracy (Part 2, 1946)

Themes

The Ivan theme appears in:
 'Overture' (A Storm Approaches)
 'Ivan's Tent'
 'Ivan at Anastasiya's Coffin'
 'Come Back!' (Finale)

Versions by other hands

Oratorio by Levon Atovmyan (1961)
 Performance history
Atovmyan's oratorio finally received its public premiere on 28 January 2012 at the Royal Festival Hall, London. Vladimir Jurowski conducted the London Philharmonic Orchestra and Chorus. The soloists were Ewa Podleś and Andrey Breus.

The Russian premiere took place on 2 April 2012 in the Great Hall of the Moscow Conservatory. Vladimir Jurowski conducted the London Philharmonic Orchestra with the Sveshnikov State Academic Russian Choir and the Chamber Choir of the Moscow Conservatory. The soloists were Elena Zaremba and Andrey Breus.

The North American premiere took place on 18 October 2012 at Davies Symphony Hall, San Francisco. Vladimir Jurowski conducted the San Francisco Symphony and Chorus. The soloists were Elena Zaremba and Andrey Breus.
Numbers
Atovmyan's oratorio is in 8 sections, some consisting of several numbers (or parts of numbers) from the film score—refer to 'Sequence' below:

The performance duration is about 45 minutes.

Scoring and instrumentation
Atovmyan's oratorio is scored for contralto or mezzo-soprano (in 'Ocean-Sea' and 'Song about the Beaver') and baritone (in 'Song of the Oprichniki'), mixed (SATB) chorus, and the following instrumentation:

Strings: violins I & II, violas, cellos, double basses
Woodwinds: 2 piccolos, 2 flutes, 2 oboes, english horn, 2 clarinets, E-flat clarinet, bass clarinet, tenor saxophone, 2 bassoons, contrabassoon
Brass: 4 horns, 5 trumpets, 3 trombones, tuba
Percussion: timpani, piccolo timpani, bass drum, snare drum, triangle, tambourine, cymbals, tam-tam, bells, xylophone, wood block, whip
Other: piano, celesta, 2 harps

Oratorio by Abram Stasevich (1961)
The following commentary, by composer and musicologist Thomas Korganov (1925-2015), was printed in the preface to Stasevich's vocal score in 1961:
"Without adding material of his own or making changes to the composer's manuscript, A. Stasevich approached the music for the film in a creative manner turning it into an oratorio consisting of 20 numbers. By repeating certain episodes and sections, and by linking them in a variety of ways, Stasevich was able to turn the various parts of this substantial work into self-contained numbers. In order to comply with the dictates of musical logic, he did not always adhere strictly to the order of the musical episodes prescribed by the plot. Thus certain episodes were transformed into tripartite structures, and others expanded to become rather large movements. Certain changes were also made to the orchestration, and certain instrumental lines were reinforced ... Stasevich also added another formal determinant in the shape of a speaker."

Performance history
The premiere took place on 23 April 1961 in the Great Hall of the Moscow Conservatory. Abram Stasevich conducted the Moscow State Philharmonic Orchestra.

Publication history
1962, Ivan the Terrible, oratorio by Abram Stasevich, vocal score, Sovetskiy Kompozitor, Moscow
1972, Ivan the Terrible, oratorio by Stasevich, full score, Sovetskiy Kompozitor, Moscow

Numbers
Stasevich's oratorio is in 20 movements, some consisting of several numbers (or parts of numbers) from the film score—refer to 'Sequence' below:

Performance duration is about 75 minutes.

Scoring and instrumentation
Stasevich's oratorio is scored for contralto (in 'Ocean-Sea' and 'Song about the Beaver') and baritone (in 'Song of the Oprichniki'), mixed (SATB) chorus, and the following instrumentation:

Strings: violins I & II, violas, cellos, double basses
Woodwinds: 3 flutes (including 2 piccolos), 3 oboes (including english horn), 5 clarinets (including E-flat clarinet & bass clarinet), alto saxophone, baritone saxophone, 4 bassoons (including contrabassoon)
Brass: 4 horns, 5 trumpets, 3 trombones, 2 tubas
Percussion: timpani, bass drum, snare drum, triangle, tambourine, cymbals, tam-tam, church bells, glockenspiel, xylophone, wood block, metal bar, whip
Other: piano, 2 gusli, 2 harps

Ballet by Mikhail Chulaki (1975)
The ballet Ivan the Terrible, arranged by Mikhail Chulaki and choreographed by Yuriy Grigorovich, debuted in February 1975 at the Bolshoy Theatre with Yuri Vladimirov in the title role. The two act (7 scenes) work consists of selections from Prokofiev's film score for Ivan the Terrible supplemented with excerpts from his Symphony No. 3 (1928), Russian Overture (1936), and 'The Field of the Dead' from the film score for Aleksandr Nevskiy (1938).
 Performance history
The world premiere performance took place on 20 February 1975 at the Bolshoy Theatre. Algis Zhuraitis conducted. The cast included Yuriy Vladimirov (Ivan), Natalya Bessmertnova (Anastasiya), and Boris Akimov (Kurbskiy).

Oratorio by Michael Lankester (1988)
Performance history
The premiere took place on 4 May 1988. Michael Lankester conducted the Hartford Symphony Orchestra.
Numbers
This version of Ivan the Terrible consists of 29 numbers.

The performance duration is about 95 minutes.

Concert Scenario by Christopher Palmer (1991)
Christopher Palmer discusses his Ivan the Terrible concert scenario in the notes to a Chandos CD recording made a few days after the work's premiere:
"...in 1962 Abram Stasevich (1906-1971), who had conducted Ivan for the film soundtrack, published his Ivan the Terrible 'oratorio' for speaker, soloists, chorus and orchestra which incorporated all the major musical sequences in the film plus a few that had been left out (notably 'Russian Sea'). It is in this form that the Ivan music has been known outside the film ever since, and in this form that critics have tended to find it long and diffuse. The main problem is the speaker, introduced by Stasevich primarily because he had been unwise enough to try and incorporate a large number of short fragmentary episodes, and had to find a way of stitching them together. Unfortunately once the speaker was in, he seemed to take over the entire work—much to its detriment in terms of narrative intelligibility and tightness of structure. My new 'performing version' eliminates the speaker and shorter sections (most of which are pastiche Russian-liturgical music of minimal Prokofievian interest). It also restores a number of episodes to their original format, most importantly the assassination of the Pretender in Part II—the climax of the film and one of the most electrifying moments in film music. While retaining Stasevich's make-up of most of the larger movements, I have reverted largely to the film's original sequence of musical events."
 Performance history
The concert scenario received its premiere on 28 February 1991 at the Royal Festival Hall in London. Neeme Järvi conducted the Philharmonia Orchestra and Chorus.
Numbers
The 'new' work is in 13 movements, some consisting of several numbers (or parts of numbers) from the film score—refer to 'Sequence' below:

The performance duration is about 60 minutes.

Recordings

Audio

Video

ReferencesNotesSources'''
Glinka State Central Museum of Musical Culture, Moscow, and Musikverlag Hans Sikorski, Hamburg, The complete music for the film 'Ivan the Terrible', notes to  CD NI 5662/3, Nimbus Records Ltd. 2000
Kravetz, Nelly, An Unknown Ivan the Terrible Oratorio, Three Oranges Journal No. 19, 2010
Palmer, Christopher, Ivan the Terrible: Concert Scenario'', notes to CD CHAN 8977, Chandos Records Ltd. 1991

External links
Prokofiev Ivan/OperaToday

Compositions by Sergei Prokofiev
Films scored by Sergei Prokofiev
Film soundtracks
1944 compositions
1945 compositions
Compositions with a narrator
Cultural depictions of Ivan the Terrible